Core Laboratories N.V. is an American service provider of core and fluid analysis in the petroleum industry.

Background
The company’s specialties include basic rock properties, special core analysis, and PVT characterization of reservoir fluids. The company is a publicly traded company on NYSE under the symbol "CLB" since July 10, 1998  and on Euronext Amsterdam since May 16, 2012.  It is classified in the GCIS Sub-Industry: Oil & Gas Equipment & Services.

References

External links

Companies listed on the New York Stock Exchange
Oilfield services companies
Natural gas companies of the United States
Oil companies of the United States